Bcl-2-like protein 1 is a protein encoded in humans by the BCL2L1 gene. Through alternative splicing, the gene encodes both of the human proteins Bcl-xL and Bcl-xS.

Function 

The protein encoded by this gene belongs to the Bcl-2 protein family. Bcl-2 family members form hetero- or homodimers and act as anti- or pro-apoptotic regulators that are involved in a wide variety of cellular activities. The proteins encoded by this gene are located at the outer mitochondrial membrane, and have been shown to regulate outer mitochondrial membrane channel (voltage-dependent anion channels (VDACs) opening. VDACs regulate mitochondrial membrane potential, and thus controls the production of reactive oxygen species and release of cytochrome C by mitochondria, both of which are the potent inducers of cell apoptosis. Two alternatively spliced transcript variants, which encode distinct isoforms, have been reported. The longer isoform (Bcl-xL) acts as an apoptotic inhibitor and the shorter form (Bcl-xS) acts as an apoptotic activator.

Interactions 

BCL2-like 1 (gene) has been shown to interact with:

 APAF1, 
 BAK1, 
 BCAP31, 
 BCL2L11, 
 BNIP3,
 BNIPL, 
 BAD, 
 BAX, 
 BIK, 
 Bcl-2, 
 HRK, 
 IKZF3, 
 Noxa, 
 PPP1CA, 
 PSEN2 
 RAD9A, 
 RTN1, 
 RTN4,  and
 VDAC1.

References

Further reading

External links
 

Proteins
Apoptosis